Hyalurga mysis is a moth of the family Erebidae. It was described by Wilhelm Ferdinand Erichson in 1848. It is found in Guyana.

References

Hyalurga
Moths described in 1848